Siddhartha is a 2015 Indian Kannada-language romance film directed by Prakash of Milana fame and produced by Parvathamma Rajkumar. The film stars Vinay Rajkumar, son of actor Raghavendra Rajkumar, in his debut, along with Apoorva Arora in the lead roles. The film has the musical score and soundtrack composed by [[Stephen Prayog
]]. The film, launched officially on 2 May 2014 and released across cinema halls on 23 January 2015.

Cast
 Vinay Rajkumar as Siddhartha aka Siddu
 Apoorva Arora as Khushi
 Naina Puttaswamy as Divya
 Shamanth Shetty as Jani
 Alok Babu as Tsunami
 Jeevan Louis as Maamu
 Abhay Surya as TK
 Deepika as Priya
 Achyuth Kumar as Mahadev, Siddhu's Father
 Ashish Vidyarthi as Yeshwanth, Khushi's Father
 Ashwini Gowda as Khushi's Mother
 Ashok
 M. S. Umesh as college principal
 Nikki Galrani as Anju (special appearance)
 Sadhu Kokila – special appearance
 Sudharani – special appearance
 Bommesh Y.D (Mandya)

Soundtrack
Music composer V. Harikrishna was roped in to score for both score and soundtrack consisting of 6 tracks. The lyrics for the songs are written by Jayanth Kaikini.

References

External links
 
 Vinay Raghavendra Rajkumar's Film Titled as Siddhartha – Exclusive

2015 films
2010s Kannada-language films
2015 romantic comedy-drama films
Indian romantic comedy-drama films
Films shot in India
Films shot in France
Films scored by V. Harikrishna